Faisal bin Abdulaziz Al Muqrin is a member of the Muqrin clan, from which the ruling family is branched. He has been serving as the mayor of Riyadh since 2019.

Education
Prince Faisal attended King Saud University and received a BA in Architecture and Building Science. This was followed by an MS in Urban Planning from Harvard University and a second MS in Architecture and Urban Design from Columbia University. Al Muqrin is a Ph.D. candidate in the Department of City and Regional Planning at the University of California Berkeley.

References

Year of birth missing (living people)
Living people
King Saud University alumni
Columbia Graduate School of Architecture, Planning and Preservation
Harvard Graduate School of Design alumni
Mayors of places in Saudi Arabia
Saudi Arabian princes